Spodoptera ornithogalli (yellow-striped armyworm, cotton cutworm) is a moth of the family Noctuidae.

When first discovered this particular species was though to be the American representative of S. littoralis as the two species have very similar forms. However, S. ornithogalli is known to have much darker color body with sharper markings.

Description

The fore-wing is brown with tan markings and a blurry white stripe coming from the wing tip. The hind-wing is white with a thin brown margin. Larvae are black with thin yellow stripes on their sides.

Adults are on wing from April to November depending on the location.

Distribution

Geographic distribution

North America
 Canada: Ontario, Quebec
 Mexico
 United States: Alabama, Arizona, Arkansas, California, Colorado, Connecticut, Delaware, Florida, Georgia, Illinois, Indiana, Iowa, Kansas, Kentucky, Louisiana, Maine, Maryland, Massachusetts, Michigan, Minnesota, Mississippi, Missouri, Nebraska, New Hampshire, New Jersey, New Mexico, New York, North Carolina, Ohio, Oklahoma, Pennsylvania, Rhode Island, South Carolina, Tennessee, Texas, Utah, Virginia, West Virginia, Wisconsin

Central America and the Caribbean

 Antigua and Barbuda, Bermuda, Costa Rica, Cuba, Dominica, Dominican Republic, El Salvador, Guatemala, Honduras, Jamaica, Puerto Rico

South America
 Argentina
 Bolivia
 Brazil: Acre, Bahia, Federal District, Espírito Santo, Mato Grosso, Mato Grosso do Sul, Pará, Paraná, Rio Grande do Sul, Roraima, Tocantins
 Colombia
 Ecuador
 French Guiana
 Peru
 Suriname
 Venezuela

Europe
There were repeated port interceptions throughout 2020, especially on consignments of asparagus from the Americas. Nonetheless so far S. ornithogalli remains otherwise absent from Europe.
Denmark: Phytosanitation interceptions only.

Asia
Japan: Phytosanitation interceptions only.

Ecological distribution
For the complete list see EPPO GD's hosts list.

The larvae feed on various crops, including alfalfa, asparagus, bean, beet, cabbage, clover, maize/corn, cotton, cucumber, hops, grape, grass, jimsonweed, morning glory, onion, pea, peach, peanut, potato, sorghum, soybean, sunflower, sweet potato, Swiss chard, tobacco, tomato, turnip, wheat, watermelon, and wild onion; ornamentals including chrysanthemum and roses; and weeds including Amaranthus retroflexus, Chenopodium album, Datura stramonium, Erigeron canadensis, Plantago lanceolata, and Rumex.

References

ornithogalli
Moths of North America
Moths of the Caribbean
Moths of South America
Moths of Cuba
Moths of Central America
Lepidoptera of Brazil
Lepidoptera of Jamaica
Moths described in 1852
Taxa named by Achille Guenée
Agricultural pest insects
Insect pests of wheat
Insect pests of ornamental plants